Video Archives was a video rental store located in Manhattan Beach, California, and later moved to Hermosa Beach, California, owned and managed by Lance Lawson and Rick Humbert. Filmmakers Quentin Tarantino, Roger Avary and Daniel Snyder worked there before becoming successful in the film industry. The store was also frequented by screenwriters Josh Olson, Jeff Maguire, John Langley, and Danny Strong.

Video Archives  closed in 1995, and Tarantino purchased its video inventory and rebuilt the store in his home.

Podcast 
In June 2021, Tarantino announced plans to start a podcast with Avary. The podcast is named after Video Archives, and features the directors and a guest examining a film which could have been offered for rental at the store. The podcast premiered on July 19, 2022.

References

External links
 RIP Video Archives by Adam Groves
 Memories of Quentin Tarantino and Video Archives by Todd Mecklem
 Quentin Tarantino buys Video Archives' inventory

Retail companies of the United States
Manhattan Beach, California
Video rental services
Quentin Tarantino